Lakkon (Russian and Tajik: Лаккон)is a village and jamoat in northern Tajikistan. It is part of the city of Isfara in Sughd Region. The jamoat has a total population of 7,579 (2015).

One of the two largest psychiatric hospitals in Tajikistan is located in Lakkon

References

Populated places in Sughd Region
Jamoats of Tajikistan